Andrew Dawson  (16 July 1863 – 20 July 1910), usually known as Anderson Dawson, was an Australian politician, the Premier of Queensland for one week (1–7 December) in 1899. This short-lived premiership was the first Australian Labor Party government and the first parliamentary labour ministry anywhere in the world.

Early life
Dawson was born on 16 July 1863 at Rockhampton, Queensland, the son of Anderson Dawson and his wife Jane (née Smith).  When he was six, his mother died in a fire, and Dawson was placed in Diamantina orphanage in Brisbane. His aunt, Mary Ann Park, then retrieved Dawson and took him to live with her family in Redbank. He later moved with the family to Gympie.  He began work as a miner at Charters Towers, in 1887 married the Irish widow Caroline Ryan, née Quinn, and later was elected first president of the Miners' Union. Dawson was originally attracted to politics by the Irish Home Rule question and in 1890 emerged as a political pamphleteer when he published The Case Stated, "an able plea for the creation of an Australian republic." The pamphlet was freely available in Charters Towers, both a trade unionist and a republican stronghold. Throughout 1890, Dawson was closely involved in the running of the Australasian Republican Association (ARA) and in February 1891 was elected the ARA’s second president. Dawson was also president, and later organiser, of the district council of the Australian Labour Federation (ALF). During the Queensland shearers’ strike, he was appointed chairman of the Queensland provincial council of the ALF, and was public in his support of socialism. He took up journalism and for a time was editor of the local newspaper, the radical The Charters Towers Eagle. He was also elected to the Local Council in Charters Towers.

Colonial politics

Dawson entered politics at the 1893 election, as one of the two Labor candidates for Charters Towers in the Legislative Assembly of Queensland. He won the seat, and retained it at the 1896 and 1899 elections. Dawson was inspired by Marxist economics, and performed speeches to the Social Democratic Federation on Marx and issues surrounding surplus labour.

When the government of James Dickson resigned on 1 December 1899, Dawson formed a ministry. Although it was defeated as soon as the Legislative Assembly next met, it nevertheless became the first socialist or Labour Party government in the world.

This remains one of the shortest ministries of any state government in Australia. In a remarkable coincidence, Vaiben Louis Solomon's contemporaneous ministry in South Australia outdid Dawson by a single day (1–8 December 1899). John Cain and Thomas Hollway, both premiers of Victoria in the 1940s–50s, had shorter ministries. Cain served for four days and Hollway for only 70 hours. These, however, were not Cain or Hollway's only terms as premier; both exceeded Dawson for total time in the role.

Federal politics
At the first Federal election for the Senate in 1901, Dawson was returned at the head of the Queensland Labor ticket. While in federal parliament, he was regarded as a good speaker, but struggled with persistent ill health associated with chronic lung trouble from his time as a miner, which worsened after he relocated his family from Queensland to the colder climate of Melbourne. He also struggled with alcoholism, and was absent from parliament for periods, frustrating his colleagues.

In April 1904, when Chris Watson formed the first Federal Labor government, Dawson was given the portfolio of Minister for Defence in light of his prominent status as a former Premier. As Minister for Defence, he clashed with Edward Hutton, the aristocratic English General Officer Commanding the Australian Military Forces, who had resisted being answerable to the executive, and had been viewed as disrespectful by previous defence ministers. Dawson proposed a military restructure which eliminated Hutton's position, which was adopted by his successor after the ousting of the Watson government, resulting in Hutton's resignation and return to England. Dawson reportedly stated that the "most satisfying facet" of his stint as minister had been that he had "pulled down from his pedestal the biggest bounder that had ever commanded the forces in Australia."

By the time of the 1906 election, Dawson had a poor relationship with the Queensland state executive of the Labor Party, and was initially demoted to the unwinnable fourth position on the Labor Senate ticket. As a result of concerns about the electoral fallout of his dumping, he was reinstated to the winnable third position on the ticket, but resigned as a candidate two months later, citing ill health. He subsequently changed his mind, but the executive refused to reinstate him, so he ran as an independent. That move split the Labor vote, and amidst a generally bad election for Labor in Queensland, the entire ticket lost.

Later life

Dawson was unable to find work in Melbourne, and returned to Queensland in 1909, while his wife and four children remained in Melbourne. He was admitted to the Brisbane General Hospital on 6 July 1910 and was expected to recover, but died of the effects of alcoholism on 20 July 1910. His widow and children reportedly did not attend his funeral. He was buried in Toowong Cemetery on 21 July 1910.

Legacy
The Federal electoral division of Dawson is named after him.

References

External links

 

1863 births
1910 deaths
Premiers of Queensland
Members of the Australian Senate for Queensland
Members of the Australian Senate
Australian Labor Party members of the Parliament of Australia
Members of the Cabinet of Australia
People from Rockhampton
Burials at Toowong Cemetery
Leaders of the Opposition in Queensland
Independent members of the Parliament of Australia
Australian Labor Party members of the Parliament of Queensland
Defence ministers of Australia
19th-century Australian politicians
20th-century Australian politicians